The 2012–13 PSV Eindhoven season saw the club competing in the 2012–13 Eredivisie, 2012–13 KNVB Cup and 2012–13 UEFA Europa League.

Squad

Players out on loan

Jong PSV

Transfers

Summer

In:

Out:

Winter

In:

Out:

Competitions

Johan Cruyff Shield

Eredivisie

Results summary

Results by round

Matches

League table

KNVB Cup

UEFA Europa League

Play-off round

Group stage

Squad statistics

Appearances and goals

|-
|colspan="14"|Players away from PSV on loan:

|-
|colspan="14"|Players who appeared for PSV no longer at the club:
|}

Goal scorers

Disciplinary record

Notes
Note 1: Zeta played their home match at Stadion Pod Goricom, Podgorica instead of their regular stadium, Stadion Trešnjica, Golubovci.

References

PSV Eindhoven seasons
Psv Eindhoven